Ezema is one of four sub-communities that made up Nru Nsukka town in Nsukka Local Government Area, Nigeria. It is adjacent to the three other sub-communities in Nru Nsukka: Edem Nru, Umuoyo Nru and Iheagu. It also shares common boundaries with Various communities such as Umuoyo, Iheagu, Agbamere/Amike and Umabor both in Eha Alumona.

Otobogidi mini market is the most popular mini and daily market in Ezema. It is a hub of home use goods and refreshment zone. Evangel school is also located here.

The main entrance roads to the community are from Fen Park junction (Enugu Road), Umabor Eha Alumona, Amolu Road via Community Secondary School Nru Nsukka and via Iheagu.

The community of Ezema is part of Ezema ne Edem autonomous community in Igboland, a cultural region of Southeastern Nigeria, and is dominated by Igbo-speaking peoples. Politically, it is part of Nru Nsukka the local government area of Nsukka, Enugu state. Ezema is merged with Edem and both are under the government of HRH Atugwu Linus Oko(Alias:Igwe Chimereze 1) of Ezema ne Edem, Nru Nsukka.

Villages
The community of Ezema is made up of ten villages: Amagu(pronounced Amégú), Amugoro, Amamkpume, Uwelu, Amankwo, Umumkporogidi, Amorah, Amaezedim, Umuokwo, and Umuario. Each village has its own village head, known as Onyishi, which is usually the eldest man in the village.

The oldest village in Ezema is Amagu, which acts as the main gathering point for all meetings involving the elders or the Ezema community. 

Ezema is believed to be one of the most peaceful communities in Nru Nsukka.

Organizations
The most-active group in Ezema is the Ezema Youth Association (incorporated in 2016) and the Ezema ne Edem Development Union. The development Union in conjunction with the Igwe's council control every affairs of Ezema and Edem community.

Geography
The high hills called Ugwu Ezema ne Edem are located in this sub-community.

Ofulonu Ezema is a land owned by Ezema Community. It is not a village rather it is a community made of indigenes of Ezema Nru. Besides it lays a big hill known as Ugwu Ezema. One of the Hills belongs to the neighboring community (Edem Nru) and the other to Ezema Nru and that is why the hills are referred as Ugwu Ezema ne Edem. Besides the hill, there is a village known as Amike village from Agbamere/Eha Alumona.

Business and occupations
Otobogidi is the business hub in Ezema, and also serves as the most-centralized point for the Ezemanians. Otobogidi also serves as mini-market for the Ezema community.

Otobogidi serves as a point of 
Meeting for joint gatherings involving Ezema and Edem only for non-delicate discussions otherwise Amegu Ezema remains their general point of meeting.

Many of the people of Ezema are artisans (such as blacksmithing, bricklaying, roofers/carpentry, etc.), farmers and the rest into trade and buying. Blacksmithing skills, for example, have been maintained for centuries in Ezema community by Amorah village precisely.

Most of the occupants of Ezema land operate businesses in the Nsukka Central market known as Ogige main market.

Religion 
The two major religions in Ezema are Christianity and Odinani, the Igbo traditional religion.

Churches in Ezema include: 
Saint Theophilus, Roman Catholic Diocese of Nsukka 
Saint Peter Anglican communion
Baptist Church
Deeper Christian Life Ministry

Those who practice Odinani pay homage to the deity Idenyi nkwo (also referred to as Alusi). Worship is led by the Attamah (chief priest) who is from, and resides in, Ezema.

Notable people

References 

Nigeria
Community